Lee Jackson is the name of:

Lee Jackson (bassist) (born 1943), English musician
Lee Jackson (blues musician) (1921 – 1979), American Chicago blues musician
Lee Jackson (rugby league) (born 1969), English rugby league footballer
Lee Jackson (composer) (born 1963), American video game composer
Lee Jackson (biathlete) (born 1980), English biathlete
Lee F. Jackson, the former chancellor of the University of North Texas System
Lee Jackson (author) (born 1971), British author and historian

It may also refer to:
 Lee–Jackson Day, a former state holiday in the US state of Virginia